Sogerianthe is a genus of flowering plants belonging to the family Loranthaceae.

Its native range is Papuasia.

Species:

Sogerianthe cupuliformis 
Sogerianthe ferruginea 
Sogerianthe sessiliflora 
Sogerianthe sogerensis 
Sogerianthe trilobobractea 
Sogerianthe versicolor

References

Loranthaceae
Santalales genera